Schreiber House may refer to:

in the United Kingdom
Schreiber House, West Hampstead, designed by architect James Gowan

in the United States
Schreiber House (Phoenix, Arizona), designed by Schreiber twins
Brock Schreiber Boathouse and Beach, Inverness, California, listed on the National Register of Historic Places (NRHP) in Marin County
Adolph Schreiber House, Boise, Idaho, NRHP-listed